The 1999–2000 Club Atlético Boca Juniors season was the 70th consecutive Primera División season played by the senior squad.

Summary 

The club' s main goal for Apertura was clinching its three consecutive League title for the first time in its history. The squad was reinforced with few players included forward Alfredo Moreno. The race for the title started early against archrivals River Plate during the whole season. Finally, the club finished on 2nd spot just below of Millonarios thanks to key injured players and a 0–2 defeat against River.

For Clausura Tournament the club was reinforced with several players included forward Marcelo Delgado from Racing. The team played a decent season finishing again on 2nd spot thanks to a judicial sanction suspended the game against Newell's Old Boys and deducting 3 points due to a fireworks throwed to the field. In the replay, Newell's won the match and Boca Juniors finished below of Champions River Plate.

Meanwhile, after six years the club returned to play Copa Libertadores and advanced to Quarterfinals defeating archrivals River Plate included a 3-0 landslide in second leg of the series at La Bombonera. In Semifinals the squad eliminated Mexican team America thanks to a 
Samuel goal in the final minutes of the second leg of the series. In the Finals of the tournament the squad defeated incumbent Champions  Palmeiras after a penalty shoot-out series clinching the title after 22 years.

Squad

Transfers

January

Competitions

Torneo Apertura

League table

Position by round

Matches

Torneo Clausura

League table

Position by round

Matches

Copa Mercosur

Copa Libertadores

Group stage

Eighthfinals

Quarterfinals

Final

Statistics

Players statistics

References

B
Club Atlético Boca Juniors seasons